Justin Clyde Mashore (born February 14, 1972) is an American professional baseball coach and former player who currently serves as the hitting coach for the AAA New Orleans Baby Cakes.

Career
Mashore was drafted by the Detroit Tigers in the third round of the 1991 Major League Baseball Draft out of Clayton Valley High School in Concord, California.

He played in Minor League Baseball until 2001 for numerous different organizations: the Tigers, San Diego Padres, Boston Red Sox, New York Mets and Colorado Rockies.

After his playing career he became a coach for numerous minor league teams.

Prior to the 2016 season, Mashore was hired by the Texas Rangers to be their assistant hitting coach, a position he retained through the 2018 season.

He was named as the Hitting Coach for the AAA New Orleans Baby Cakes of the Miami Marlins organization.

Personal life
His father, Clyde Mashore, and brother Damon Mashore both played in MLB.

References

External links

1972 births
Living people
People from Concord, California
Baseball players from California
Major League Baseball hitting coaches
Texas Rangers coaches
Bristol Tigers players
Fayetteville Generals players
Lakeland Tigers players
Trenton Thunder players
Jacksonville Suns players
Toledo Mud Hens players
Arizona League Padres players
Mobile BayBears players
Chico Heat players
Sarasota Red Sox players
St. Lucie Mets players
Binghamton Mets players
Yuma Bullfrogs players
Carolina Mudcats players
Minor league baseball coaches